John Michael Spender  (2 December 1935 – 13 October 2022) was an Australian politician, diplomat and barrister. He was a member of the House of Representatives from 1980 to 1990, representing the Liberal Party, and was a shadow minister under Andrew Peacock and John Howard. He later served as Ambassador to France from 1996 to 2000.

Early life
Spender was born in Sydney on 2 December 1935. He was the son of Jean (née Henderson) and Percy Spender. His mother was a novelist and his father was a politician, diplomat and judge who served as  Ambassador to the United States in the 1950s.

Spender was educated at Yale University and Gray's Inn. He returned to Australia and practised as a barrister in Sydney from 1961 to 1980. He was appointed Queen's Counsel (QC) in 1974. In 1978, he represented the Shop, Distributive and Allied Employees Association (SDA) in a lawsuit against the Australian Workers' Union (AWU).

Spender was commissioned by the Government of New South Wales to report on the collapse of Gollin Holdings Limited. He found that the company's managing director Keith Gale had falsified accounts to cover a $10.8 million loss in 1975, and had also misappropriated company funds. His final report was tabled in state parliament in March 1979, and recommended changes to company laws and practices.

Politics
Spender served as treasurer and metropolitan vice-president of the Liberal Party of Australia (New South Wales Division). In 1979, he and state president David Patten conducted an inquiry into Lyenko Urbanchich, a Liberal Party official who had been accused of collaboration with the Nazis in war-time Slovenia. They found no clear evidence to verify the allegations but recommended he be barred from holding party office with the permission of the state executive. However, the state executive subsequently voted that Urbanchich be expelled from the party.

Spender unsuccessfully sought Liberal preselection at the 1969 federal election (in Warringah) and the 1973 Parramatta by-election. He was eventually elected to the House of Representatives at the 1980 federal election, succeeding Bill Graham in North Sydney. After the Coalition's defeat in 1983, he was appointed to Andrew Peacock's shadow ministry with responsibility for aviation and defence support. He was later removed for opposing the Costigan Commission.

Following the 1985 leadership spill, the new opposition leader John Howard appointed Spender as shadow attorney-general. In June 1986, he strongly criticised proposals for a bill of rights. In April 1987, he succeeded Peter Baume as the Coalition's spokesman on the status of women, in the absence of any women in the shadow ministry. After the 1987 federal election Spender was given the foreign affairs portfolio. In August 1988, he called for all Australian sanctions against South Africa to be removed, stating they had slowed reform.

Spender held the seat until his defeat by prominent independent Ted Mack at the 1990 election. He lost over 18 percent of his primary vote from 1987, allowing Mack to win when Democrat and Labor preferences flowed overwhelmingly to him.

Ambassador
In 1996, Spender was appointed Australian Ambassador to France, a position he held until 2000. He was also non-resident ambassador to Portugal (1996–1998) and special envoy to Cyprus (1996–2000). He was awarded a Legion D'honneur by the French government for the work he did to build French and Australian relations.

Personal life and death
Spender was married to fashion designer Carla Zampatti and had two children. They married in 1975, but separated in 2008 and divorced in 2010. He then married Catherine Spender. His daughters are Bianca Spender, a fashion designer and Allegra, who was elected to the House of Representatives at the 2022 federal election, standing as a teal independent against an incumbent Liberal MP. He publicly endorsed his daughter's candidacy.

Spender died in Sydney on 13 October 2022, at the age of 86.

References

1935 births
2022 deaths
Ambassadors of Australia to France
Ambassadors of Australia to Portugal
Australian barristers
Yale Law School alumni
Liberal Party of Australia members of the Parliament of Australia
Members of the Australian House of Representatives for North Sydney
Members of the Australian House of Representatives
Australian King's Counsel
21st-century King's Counsel
20th-century Australian politicians